The men's singles of the 2017 Advantage Cars Prague Open tournament was played on clay in Prague, Czech Republic.

Santiago Giraldo was the defending champion but chose not to defend his title.

Andrej Martin won the title after defeating Yannick Maden 7–6(7–3), 6–3 in the final.

Seeds

Draw

Finals

Top half

Bottom half

References

External Links
Main Draw
Qualifying Draw

Advantage Cars Prague Open - Men's Singles
2017 Men's Singles